Figure skating at the 1999 Winter Asian Games took place in the Yongpyong Indoor Ice Rink, Yongpyong, Gangwon, South Korea with four events contested.

The competition took place from 3 to 5 February 1999.

Schedule

Medalists

Medal table

Participating nations
A total of 38 athletes from 7 nations competed in figure skating at the 1999 Asian Winter Games:

References
Results
China continues Winter Games domination

External links
 OCA official website

 
1999 Asian Winter Games events
1999
Asian Winter Games
International figure skating competitions hosted by South Korea